Per Svante Gudmund Nordin (born April 18, 1946) is a Swedish historian of ideas and author. He is a professor of history of ideas at Lund University.

With his dissertation Interpretation and method. Studies in the explication of nature (1978) Nordin became a PhD in theoretical philosophy. In 1981 he became an associate professor in history of ideas and in 1999 a full professor in the same discipline.

During the 1980s his research was focused on the history of philosophy and he wrote a groundbreaking work on the history of Swedish philosophy during the 1800s and 1900s. From the 1990s on, he has mainly focused on cultural currents during the 1900s. His book Filosofernas krig was nominated for the August Prize. Nordin has written several textbooks in philosophy and the history of ideas. When he turned 60 he was honored with a festschrift, Filosofiska citat.

Bibliography
Interpretation and method. Studies in the explication of literature, Lund, 1978.
Den Boströmska skolan och den svenska idealismens fall, Lund: Doxa, 1981. 
Historia och vetenskap. En essä om marxismen, historicismen och humaniora, Lund: Zenit, 1981. 
Från Hägerström till Hedenius. Den moderna svenska filosofin, Bodafors: Doxa, 1984. 
Romantikens filosofi. Svensk idealism från Höijer till hegelianerna, Lund: Doxa, 1987. 
Från tradition till apokalyps. Historieskrivning och civilisationskritik i det moderna Europa, Stockholm: Symposion, 1989. 
Fredrik Böök. En levnadsteckning, Stockholm: Natur & Kultur, 1994. 
Filosofins historia. Det västerländska förnuftets äventyr från Thales till postmodernismen, Lund: Studentlitteratur, 1995 (utökad uppl. 2003). 
Det pessimistiska förnuftet. Filosofiska essäer och porträtt, Nora: Nya Doxa, 1996. 
Filosofernas krig. Den europeiska filosofin under första världskriget, Nora: Nya Doxa, 1998. 
Det politiska tänkandets historia, Lund: Studentlitteratur, 1999 (utökad uppl. 2006). 
"Förlåt jag blott citerar." Om citatets historia, Nora: Nya Doxa, 2001. 
Ingemar Hedenius. En filosof och hans tid, Stockholm: Natur & Kultur, 2004. 
Nittonhundratalet. En biografi. Makter, människor och idéer under ett århundrade, Stockholm: Atlantis, 2005. 
Globaliseringens idéhistoria, Lund: Studentlitteratur, 2006. 
Humaniora i Sverige – Framväxt – Guldålder – Kris, Stockholm: Atlantis, 2008. 
Fyra som förde krig, Stockholm: Atlantis, 2009. 
Filosoferna. Det västerländska tänkandet sedan år 1900, Stockholm: Atlantis, 2011. 
 Drottningen och filosofen. Mötet mellan Christina och Descartes Atlantis, 2012
 Winston. Churchill och den brittiska världsordningens slut Atlantis, 2013
 Sven Stolpe. Blåsten av ett temperament Atlantis, 2014
 Filosoferna. Den moderna världens födelse och det västerländska tänkandet 1776–1900, Natur & Kultur, 2016. 
 Efter revolutionen. Vänstern i svensk kulturdebatt sedan 1968 (med Lennart Berntson) Stockholm: Natur & kultur, 2017
 Hitlers München, Natur & kultur, 2018
 Filosofins litterära formvärld och andra studier, Axess Publishing, 2018
 Sveriges moderna historia. Fem politiska projekt 1809-2019, Natur & kultur, 2019
 Tanke och dröm. Svensk idéhistoria från 1900, Timbro, 2021
 Filosoferna. Vetenskaplig revolution och upplysning 1650-1776 Fri Tanke, 2022

References

1946 births
Living people
20th-century Swedish historians
Academic staff of Lund University
21st-century Swedish historians